Albert Mehrabian (born 1939) is Professor Emeritus of Psychology at the University of California, Los Angeles. He is best known for his publications on the relative importance of verbal and nonverbal mess.

Early life and career
Mehrabian was born in 1939 to an Armenian family living in Iran. He originally trained as an engineer, but is best known for his publications on the relative importance of verbal and nonverbal messages. He also constructed a number of psychological measures including the Arousal Seeking Tendency Scale. Mehrabian's findings on inconsistent messages of feelings and attitudes (the "8%-37%-55% Rule") are well-known, the percentages relating to relative impact of words, tone of voice, and body language when speaking. Arguably, these findings have been misquoted and misinterpreted throughout human communication seminars worldwide.

Attitudes and congruence
According to Mehrabian, the three elements account differently for our liking for the person who puts forward a message concerning their feelings: words account for 7%, tone of voice accounts for 38%, and facial expression accounts for 55% of the liking.

For effective and meaningful communication about emotions, these three parts of the message need to support each other - they have to be "congruent". In case of any incongruence, the receiver of the message might be irritated by two messages coming from two different channels, giving cues in two different directions.

The following example should help illustrate incongruence in verbal and non-verbal communication.
 Verbal: "I do not have a problem with you!"
 Non-verbal: person avoids eye contact, looks anxious, etc.

It becomes more likely that the receiver will trust the predominant form of communication, which to Mehrabian's findings is the non-verbal impact of tone+facial expression (38% + 55%), rather than the literal meaning of the words (7%). This is known as "the 7%-38%-55% Rule".

It is important to say that in the respective study, Mehrabian conducted experiments dealing with communications of feelings and attitudes (i.e., like-dislike) and that the above, disproportionate influence of tone of voice and facial expression becomes effective only when the situation is ambiguous. Such ambiguity appears mostly when the words spoken are inconsistent with the tone of voice or facial expression of the speaker (sender).

Misinterpretation
The "7%-38%-55% rule" has been widely misinterpreted. It is often claimed that in any communication, the meaning of a message is conveyed mainly by non-verbal cues, not by the meaning of words. This generalization from the initially very specific conditions in his experiments is the common mistake made in relation to Mehrabian's rule. On his website, Mehrabian clearly states:
Total Liking = 7% Verbal Liking + 38% Vocal Liking + 55% Facial Liking. Please note that this and other equations regarding the relative importance of verbal and nonverbal messages were derived from experiments dealing with communications of feelings and attitudes (i.e., like–dislike). Unless a communicator is talking about their feelings or attitudes, these equations are not applicable. Also see references 286 and 305 in Silent Messages – these are the original sources of my findings.

Criticism
The "7%-38%-55%" rule is based on two studies reported in the 1967 papers "Decoding of Inconsistent Communications", and "Inference of Attitudes from Nonverbal Communication in Two Channels". Both studies dealt with the communication of positive or negative emotions via single spoken words, like "dear" or "terrible". The first study compared the relative importance of the semantic meaning of the word with the tone of voice, and found that the latter was much more influential. The second study dealt with facial expressions (shown in black-and-white photographs) and vocal tone (as heard in a tape recording), and found that the relative contributions of the two communication channels had the ratio 3:2. Mehrabian then combined the results of the two studies to obtain the ratio 7:38:55.

There are several limitations of the study's applicability to real life, which are largely ignored when the study is now cited outside a scientific context and contribute to the misinterpretation above. First, it is based on the judgment of the meaning of single tape of recorded words, i.e., a very artificial context. Second, the figures are obtained by combining results from two different studies which are inappropriately combined. Third, it relates only to the communication of positive versus negative emotions. Fourth, it relates only to women, as men did not participate in the study. Fifth, other types of nonverbal communication, e.g., body posture, were not included in the studies.

Since then, other studies have analyzed the relative contributions of verbal and nonverbal signals under more naturalistic situations. One in 1970, using video tapes shown to the subjects, analyzed the communication of submissive/dominant attitude and found that all types of non-verbal cues combined – especially body posture – had 4.3 times the effect of verbal cues. On the other hand, another in 1992, dealing with the communication of happy/sad mood, found that hearing words spoken in a "flat" voice was about 4 times more influential than facial expressions seen in a film with no sound. Thus, different studies may reach very different conclusions dependent on methodology.

See also
 PAD emotional state model
 Bandwagon Effect

References

Further reading

External links
 Albert Mehrabian's web site
 Analysis of misconceptions about Mehrabian's research
 Review of post-Mehrabian research and findings
 Professor Emeritus, Department of Psychology, UCLA

20th-century American psychologists
21st-century American psychologists
Emotion psychologists
American people of Armenian descent
Clark University alumni
University of California, Los Angeles faculty
Living people
1939 births